Craig Wilson (born November 28, 1964) is a former professional baseball player. He played all or parts of five seasons in Major League Baseball from 1989 through 1993, primarily as a third baseman but also playing at second base and in the outfield.

Wilson was born in Annapolis, Maryland to his mother, Bernice, and father, Calvin. He played high school football and baseball at Annapolis High School. He turned down a scholarship offer to play college football at Howard University in order to play college baseball at Anne Arundel Community College.

He was selected in the 20th round of the 1984 Major League Baseball Draft by the St. Louis Cardinals. He played in the Cardinals' organization through 1992, including 1989 through 1992 at the Major League level. During the 1992-93 offseason, Wilson was traded along with Félix José to the Kansas City Royals in exchange for Gregg Jeffries and a minor league player. Wilson played one season for the Royals, then became a free agent. He played two more seasons in the minor leagues before retiring after the 1995 season.

Shortly after his retirement, he served as an assistant baseball coach at Annapolis High School and a head coach at The Key School.

He made a brief comeback in the Mexican League for the Guerreros de Oaxaca in 2003, but retired again after 14 games.

References

External links

1964 births
Living people
African-American baseball players
American expatriate baseball players in Mexico
Arkansas Travelers players
Baseball players from Illinois
Charros de Jalisco players
Guerreros de Oaxaca players
Erie Cardinals players
Kansas City Royals players
Louisville Redbirds players
Major League Baseball first basemen
Major League Baseball left fielders
Major League Baseball right fielders
Major League Baseball second basemen
Major League Baseball third basemen
Mexican League baseball third basemen
Omaha Royals players
Oklahoma City 89ers players
Springfield Cardinals players
St. Louis Cardinals players
St. Petersburg Cardinals players
Toledo Mud Hens players
21st-century African-American people
20th-century African-American sportspeople
Junior college baseball players in the United States
Anne Arundel Community College people